The 1972 Ballon d'Or,  given to the best football player in Europe as judged by a panel of sports journalists from UEFA member countries, was awarded to the West German defender Franz Beckenbauer on 26 December 1972. There were 25 voters, from Austria, Belgium, Bulgaria, Czechoslovakia, Denmark, East Germany, England, Finland, France, Greece, Hungary, Italy, Luxembourg, the Netherlands, Poland, Portugal, Republic of Ireland, Romania, Soviet Union, Spain, Sweden, Switzerland, Turkey, West Germany and Yugoslavia. Beckenbauer became the second West German national and Bayern Munich player to win the trophy after Gerd Müller (1970).

Rankings

References

External links
 France Football Official Ballon d'Or page

1972
1972–73 in European football